Stefan Cebara (born 12 April 1991) is a Canadian professional soccer player.

Early life
Cebara was born in the city of Zadar to a Serb father and a Croat mother and spent his early years in the town of Benkovac. He first moved to Belgrade with his family when he was four, and then to Canada at the age of six. At the age of nine he started playing with Windsor FC Nationals. He grew up competing in soccer, basketball, hockey, volleyball and track/field.

Club career

Early career
Cebara played for the Windsor FC Nationals before moving to Serbia to join Rad Belgrade. He played with their youth team, although he also had the chance to play a few exhibition matches with the main team alongside future Canadian national team goalkeeper Milan Borjan.

Zalaegerszeg
After a year in Belgrade he moved to Hungary and signed with Zalaegerszeg. He scored in his first-team debut on 2 March 2011, in a Hungarian Cup match against Vasas, however as the youngest player on the team he divided his time between the first team and the reserve team. Cebara made two appearances in the Hungarian Championship before leaving to join the Canadian U20 team in their World Cup qualifiers. After his return the club began experiencing financial difficulties and Cebara had problems cancelling his contract, so he spent the following 6 months inactive.

Celje
In August 2012 he went on a ten-day trial period at Italian club Udinese, however a month later, on 11 September, he signed a two-year contract with Slovenian side NK Celje. He made his debut for Celje on 16 September 2012, in a Slovenian First League game against Koper.

Zlaté Moravce
In February 2015, Cebara was reported to have signed with ViOn Zlaté Moravce of the Fortuna Liga.

Vojvodina
After spending six months with Lithuanian A Lyga club Utenis Utena, on 10 July 2017 Cebara signed a two-year-deal with Serbian club Vojvodina Novi Sad.

Valour FC
On 3 April 2020, Cebara signed with Canadian Premier League side Valour FC. He made his debut for Valour on August 16 against Cavalry FC. In December 2022, Valour announced Cebara would be departing the club.

International career
Cebara was 19 when he made his debut in the Canadian youth program in 2011 with coach Valerio Gazzola. He represented the Canadian national under-20 team at the 2011 CONCACAF U-20 Championship.

On 14 March 2013, Cebara received his first call up by the Canadian national team for friendlies against Japan and Belarus. He made his first appearance on 22 March as a second half sub for Kyle Bekker during a 2–1 defeat to Japan.

References

External links

 
 

1991 births
Living people
Association football forwards
Canadian soccer players
Soccer people from Ontario
Sportspeople from Zadar
People from Benkovac
Sportspeople from Windsor, Ontario
Canadian people of Croatian descent
Canadian people of Serbian descent
Yugoslav Wars refugees
Yugoslav emigrants to Canada
Naturalized citizens of Canada
Canadian expatriate soccer players
Expatriate footballers in Hungary
Canadian expatriate sportspeople in Hungary
Expatriate footballers in Slovenia
Canadian expatriate sportspeople in Slovenia
Expatriate footballers in Slovakia
Canadian expatriate sportspeople in Slovakia
Expatriate footballers in Lithuania
Canadian expatriate sportspeople in Lithuania
Expatriate footballers in Serbia
Canadian expatriate sportspeople in Serbia
Zalaegerszegi TE players
NK Celje players
FC ViOn Zlaté Moravce players
FK Utenis Utena players
FK Vojvodina players
Valour FC players
Nemzeti Bajnokság I players
Slovenian PrvaLiga players
Slovak Super Liga players
A Lyga players
Serbian SuperLiga players
Canadian Premier League players
Canada men's youth international soccer players
Canada men's international soccer players
2011 CONCACAF U-20 Championship players